Coiled-coil domain-containing protein 57 is a protein that in humans is encoded by the CCDC57 gene.

Model organisms

Model organisms have been used in the study of CCDC57 function. A conditional knockout mouse line, called Ccdc57tm1a(EUCOMM)Wtsi was generated as part of the International Knockout Mouse Consortium program — a high-throughput mutagenesis project to generate and distribute animal models of disease to interested scientists.

Male and female animals underwent a standardized phenotypic screen to determine the effects of deletion. Twenty six tests were carried out on mutant mice and two significant abnormalities were observed. The animals displayed hydrocephaly and had abnormal hypodermis fat layer morphology.

References

External links

Further reading 
 

Genes mutated in mice